The Maharaja of Patiala was a maharaja in India and the ruler of the princely state of Patiala, a state in British India. The Maharajas of Patiala were Sidhu Jats. The first Maharaja of Patiala was Baba Ala Singh (1695–1765).

Yadavindra Singh became the maharaja on 23 March 1938.  He was the last independent maharaja, agreeing to the accession of Patiala State into the newly independent Union of India in 1947. On 5 May 1948, he became Rajpramukh of the new Indian state of Patiala and East Punjab States Union.

Early proposals of a Sikh nation of ‘Sikhistan’ led by Maharaja of Patiala  were published by Dr VS Bhatti for a “Khalistan led by the Maharaja of Patiala with the aid of a cabinet consisting of representative federating units.”. These would consist of the central districts of Punjab province then directly administered by the British, including Ludhiana, Jalandhar, Ambala, Ferozpur, Amritsar and Lahore; the 'princely states' of the Cis-Sutlej, including Patiala, Nabha, Faridkot and Malerkolta; and the 'Shimla Group' of states. After partition of India in 1947, The Liberator, a Sikh publication advocated for Khalistan which would include East Punjab merged with PEPSU led by Maharaja of Patiala as it’s Monarch.

List

See also
 Patiala House Courts Complex  housed in the former palace of the Maharaja

Notes

External links

 Collar del Maharaja de Patiala

Patiala
Lists of Indian monarchs